McLanahan, McClanahan or McLanachan is a surname. Notable people with the surname include:

Eugene McLanahan Wilson (1833–1890), Representative from Minnesota
James Xavier McLanahan (1809–1861), Democratic member of the U.S. House of Representatives from Pennsylvania
Patrick McLanahan, fictional aviator created by author Dale Brown
Rue McClanahan (1934–2010), American actress, known for roles on television
Sara McLanahan, American sociologist
Tenant McLanahan (1820–1848), officer in the United States Navy during the Mexican–American War
Ward McLanahan (1883–1974), American track and field athlete who competed in the 1904 Summer Olympics
Willie McLanachan (born 1947), Scottish footballer
, Clemson-class destroyer in the United States Navy
, Benson-class destroyer in the United States Navy during World War II

See also
McLain (disambiguation)
McLane (disambiguation)
McLean (disambiguation)